Khiyarat Dannun (also spelled Khiara) is a village in the Rif Dimashq Governorate in southern Syria south of Damascus. Nearby localities include Khan Dannun to the west, al-Kiswah to the north and Deir Ali to the southeast. Khiyarat Dannun had a population of 3,645 in 2004.

References

Populated places in Markaz Rif Dimashq District
Villages in Syria